Mordialloc Secondary College or Mordialloc College is a state co-educational secondary school located in the suburbs of Melbourne at Aspendale, City of Kingston, on the south bank of the Mordialloc Creek.

It was founded in February 1924 as the Mordialloc District High School, with 148 students who were temporarily accommodated in the Mechanics Institute Hall in Albert Street, Mordialloc. Later that year the school's name changed to Mordialloc Carrum District High school when it was officially opened by Cr Roy Beardsworth of the Borough of Carrum; it was subsequently known as the Mordialloc Chelsea High School.

On 15 February 1928 the main redbrick building at the present site was completed with eight classrooms; subjects taught at that time included commercial studies, domestic science, woodwork, sheetmetal working and blacksmithing.

The College currently has over 1000 students in year 7 to year 12 and offers a broad range of academic and creative subjects. It also offers extracurricular activities including a rock eisteddfod, musical productions and bands, camps, overseas tours, competitions and Duke of Edinburgh Awards. It has an International Student Program with an accredited English Language Centre, supported by an established network of homestay families, and a Select Entry Accelerated Learning (Gifted Children) Program. The S.E.A.L program exists for years 7 - 10.

The College Alumni Association was incorporated in October 2014. One of its aims is to become the central repository of material and resources pertaining to the school, before the school's centenary in 2024.

References

Public high schools in Victoria (Australia)
Buildings and structures in the City of Kingston (Victoria)
Educational institutions established in 1924
1924 establishments in Australia